Gary Chan Hak-kan, BBS, JP (born 24 April 1976) is a current member of the Legislative Council of Hong Kong. He represents the New Territories North East constituency and is a member of the Democratic Alliance for the Betterment and Progress of Hong Kong (DAB) political party.

Chan was born in Fujian, People's Republic of China.  He graduated from the Department of Government and Public Administration at the Chinese University of Hong Kong, and studied in the Maxwell School of Citizenship and Public Affairs, Syracuse University. He was a member of Sha Tin District Council from 1999 to 2003. He was appointed as special assistant to the Chief Executive of Hong Kong, Sir Donald Tsang, from 2006 to 2008, with an annual salary of HK$77,000.

In 2008, Chan followed Lau Kong Wah in running to represent New Territories East in the Legislative Council elections after resigning as special assistant to the Chief Executive. With about 100,000 votes for their party list, both Chan and Lau were declared elected.

Shortly after the election results were announced, Chan was widely ridiculed for his poor English. He is quoted as saying in response to a reporter's question that the DAB would "try our breast ... to improve people's living hood ".

In February 2021, Chan supported a maximum length of hair for prisoners in Hong Kong, claiming that "If prisoners have long hair, they can hide small blades or weapons in their hair and that could threaten the safety of correctional officers or other inmates ... Discipline is needed in jail."

In 2010, Chan voted to build a cemetery near the mainland China border, but in 2021, became vigorously opposed to it.

In January 2022, Chan did not raise his right hand when taking the oath while being sworn in as a legislative councillor.

In October 2022, Chan said he was disappointed that Article 23 security legislation was pushed back and not part of any plan to be introduced in 2022, saying that the national security law was "incomplete."

On 16 October 2022, Chan said that housing in Hong Kong could be solved, saying "It's the same in Hong Kong.. The land and housing problem and the gap between the rich and poor are not unsolvable, as long as the SAR government puts in the work and Hong Kong people are united.

Controversies

Urine inspection
In a pre-election debate on 2008, Chan proposed to impose mandatory drug tests on teenagers returning from Mainland China, so as to fight against the abuse of narcotics by them. The plan was criticised as abusing human rights.

Libel
In another pre-election debate on 2008, Chan questioned Leung Kwok-hung regarding his "one-minute attendance" in each LegCo meeting. Leung denied the accusation and considered it a libel on him. He replied with the fact that he had over 95% attendance and asked for an apology.

Inadequate English proficiency
Shortly after the result of the Legislative Council was announced and Chan's victory and position as a Legislative Councillor  was confirmed, Chan was interviewed by the press on live TV, where he was questioned by one of the English-speaking reporters:

Chan replied: 

His mistake involving the replacement of the word "best" by "breast, in particular, was criticised in the media and the general public in Hong Kong for his lack of English language proficiency despite being a Legislative Councillor. A clip from the interview was uploaded on YouTube and subtitled to enhance the stutters and the phrase "try our breast".

References

1976 births
Alumni of the Chinese University of Hong Kong
Politicians from Xiamen
District councillors of Sha Tin District
Living people
Maxwell School of Citizenship and Public Affairs alumni
New Territories Association of Societies politicians
Democratic Alliance for the Betterment and Progress of Hong Kong politicians
HK LegCo Members 2008–2012
HK LegCo Members 2012–2016
HK LegCo Members 2016–2021
HK LegCo Members 2022–2025
Hong Kong pro-Beijing politicians
Recipients of the Bronze Bauhinia Star